Tarryn Bright (born 26 April 1983) is a South African field hockey player who competed in the 2008 and 2012 Summer Olympics.  She was named South Africa Hockey Women's player of the year 2007 and 2011 and best Interprovincial Player during a South African hockey carnival in 2014.

Whilst injured in the 2017/18 season she was sidelined from the prestigious Suburban Lions Hockey Club (previously Riverside Lions). Bright's presence in the striker line in the club's 2nd side ensured her a top 3 spot coming into round 14. Bright also has a vital contribution in helping to coach the highly successful Lions men’s masters side with a strong showing in finals for the last six years resulting in four grand final appearances and two premierships.

References

External links 
 

1983 births
Living people
South African people of British descent
South African female field hockey players
Olympic field hockey players of South Africa
Field hockey players at the 2008 Summer Olympics
Field hockey players at the 2012 Summer Olympics
Field hockey players at the 2006 Commonwealth Games
Commonwealth Games competitors for South Africa
Field hockey players at the 2014 Commonwealth Games